Rossie was a schooner launched at Baltimore in 1807. At the outbreak of the War of 1812 she became a privateer, operating under a letter of marque. She made two voyages, the first as a privateer, and the less successful second as a letter of marque. The British captured her in January 1813.

Construction
Thomas Kemp of Fell's Point, Baltimore, built and launched her. He would go to build several other schooners that would become among the most successful privateer of the war, such as Chasseur.

First letter of marque
Rossie was commissioned on 11 July 1812, right at the outbreak of the war. Her owners hired Joshua Barney as her captain and Silvanus Long as her first lieutenant. She had letter of marque #1. On her first cruise under Barney she captured some 18 vessels in six weeks off Nova Scotia and Newfoundland. Barney then put in at Newport, Rhode Island on 30 August. He replenished his supplies and then cruised southward. On his cruise, Barney thrice out-sailed British frigates. He engaged in two actions, the first with the Jenny (or Jeanie), of 12 guns. He captured her and did not report any casualties. Lloyd's List reported that Rossies prize, Jane, of 12 guns, carrying 20,000 bushels of salt, had arrived in Newport on 5 September. Rossie also captured the brig Nymphe, Patch, master, which had been sailing from the West Indies, and carried her into Boston.
 	 	

Rossie captured Kitty, Thompson, master, on 31 July as she was sailing from Greenock to New Brunswick. On 1 August Rossie captured the brig Two Brothers, and burnt four "Bankers", loaded with fish. Three days later,  recaptured Kitty and sent her into Newfoundland.

It was on the second leg of the cruise that Rossies most famous action took place. On 16 September 1812 she captured the Post Office Packet Service packet ship Princess Amelia. At the time Rossie was armed with ten 12-pounder guns and one long 9-pounder on a pivot, and had a crew of 95; Princess Amelia was armed with four 6-pounders and two 9-pounders, and had a crew of 27 or 28. Princess Amelia had to strike after she had lost three men killed, including her captain, Isaac Moorsom, and her sailing master, John Nankevell, and 11 men wounded. (Some of the wounded may have died later as a report on her arrival in Savannah gives her casualties as six dead and six or seven wounded.) American casualties were seven men wounded, one of them, Sylvanus Long, severely. Barney sent Princess Amelia into Savannah, Georgia, where the US Navy bought her and named her USS Troup.

Barney returned to Baltimore on 11 October. Merrimack, Cook, master, which had been sailing from Liverpool when Rossie captured her, arrived 12 days later.

Barney estimated that on this voyage he had captured 3698 tons of British shipping, worth US$1.5 million. He also had captured 217 prisoners. Of course, it helped that many of the vessels that he captured did not know that the war had begun.

Second letter of marque
Rossie was commissioned on 3 December 1812 with J. D. Daniels as captain and James Stubbs as first lieutenant. The Royal Navy's Rochfort squadron captured her on 6 January 1813 in the Basque Roads. She was carrying coffee from Baltimore to Bordeaux, and the announcement of her capture states that she had only one gun. The actual captor appears to have been . Rossie arrived in Plymouth on 17 January 1813. Eight ships of the Royal Navy were in sight at the capture, as was the British privateer Chance.

Notes, citations, and references
Notes

Citations

References
 
 

Privateer ships of the United States
Ships built in Baltimore
1807 ships
Schooners of the United States
Captured ships